James Christian Urbaniak (born September 17, 1963) is an American character actor. He is best known for his roles as Simon Grim in three Hal Hartley films: Henry Fool (1997), Fay Grim (2006) and Ned Rifle (2014), Robert Crumb in American Splendor (2003), Dr. Thaddeus "Rusty" Venture on the animated series The Venture Bros. (2003–2018), Grant Grunderschmidt on Review (2014–2017), and Arthur Tack on Difficult People (2015–2017).

Personal life
Urbaniak was born in Bayonne, New Jersey and lives in Los Angeles, California. He is of Polish and Ukrainian descent.

Career
Urbaniak's first media appearance occurred in 1983, when at the age of 20, he went onstage from the audience of Late Night with David Letterman, to try his hand at a monologue joke that Letterman had flubbed.

One of his first noteworthy roles was in the avant-garde playwright/director Richard Foreman's The Universe, for which Urbaniak won an Obie. He has also been acclaimed for his acting in the films Henry Fool and American Splendor, in the latter of which he played legendary cartoonist R. Crumb. He was nominated for a Drama Desk Award for his role in Thom Pain (based on nothing). He provides the voice for main character Dr. Thaddeus Venture on The Venture Bros. as well as the Doctor's brother Jonas Venture Junior and the super-villain Phantom Limb.

Urbaniak played a pizza guy in the famous "Whassup?" television commercials for Budweiser. The commercial was especially prominent on commercial television networks in the United Kingdom, where it became a cultural phenomenon. He also portrayed the moderator in "Human Centipede Anonymous", a Funny or Die short depicting three men who grapple with their past as a human centipede.

Urbaniak appeared on Ken Reid's TV Guidance Counselor podcast on May 13, 2015.

From 2015 to 2017, he played Arthur Tack for all three seasons of the critically-acclaimed Hulu comedy series Difficult People, opposite Julie Klausner and Billy Eichner.

In 2017, he played Dr. Kincaid in the movie Wonderstruck, directed by Todd Haynes. Also in 2017, he played the Maaldorian Doctor on the hit series Supergirl.

In 2018, he played the recurring role of Special Agent Owen Quinn on the CBS series Criminal Minds.

In 2019, he played Marcus Strang in the movie Where'd You Go, Bernadette, written and directed by Richard Linklater. Also in 2019, he played the recurring role of Gavin Donahue on the Apple TV+ series For All Mankind.

In 2020, he played Professor Anthony in the movie Tesla, opposite Ethan Hawke. Also in 2020, he played The Trinket Man on the Netflix series The Chilling Adventures of Sabrina.

In 2021, he played Bram in the movie Things Heard & Seen, opposite Amanda Seyfried. Also in 2021, he appeared on the television shows Dickinson, 9-1-1: Lone Star, and as the Backstage Manager on The Morning Show.

In 2022, he played the Principal of Grand View High School in the movie The Fabelmans, directed by Steven Spielberg. Also in 2022, he appeared on the television series Made for Love and appeared as Norm Wakely in an episode of the series Better Call Saul.

Filmography

Film

Television

Video games

Other works

References

External links
 
 

1963 births
Living people
Actors from Bayonne, New Jersey
American male film actors
American male voice actors
American people of Polish descent
American people of Ukrainian descent
Male actors from New Jersey
20th-century American male actors
21st-century American male actors